The Kya Lighthouse is a coastal lighthouse in the municipality of Osen in Trøndelag county, Norway. The Buholmråsa Lighthouse is located nearby, closer to the mainland. It was built in 1920 and it was automated in 1958. The lighthouse was one of the most exposed lighthouses on the Norwegian coast due to its distance from the mainland and lack of nearby islands. The lighthouse has endured repeated storm damage over the years. It was also a very difficult assignment for lighthouse keepers prior to its automation in 1958. The facility is only accessible by boat.

The light emits a white flash every 10 seconds. The light is only lit from July 25 until May 12 every year, but is not lit during the late spring and early summer due to the midnight sun.

See also

Lighthouses in Norway
List of lighthouses in Norway

References

External links
 Norsk Fyrhistorisk Forening 
 Picture of  Kya Lighthouse

Lighthouses completed in 1920
Osen
Lighthouses in Trøndelag